Yangji Station is an interchange station on Line 1 and Line 5 of the Guangzhou Metro. It started operations on 28June 1999 and is situated under Zhongshan 1st Road in Guangzhou's Yuexiu District, near Yangji Cun.

Station layout

References

Railway stations in China opened in 1999
Guangzhou Metro stations in Yuexiu District